Irakli Bagration-Mukhraneli (21 March 1909 – 30 October 1977) was a Georgian prince of the Mukhrani branch of the former royal dynasty of Bagrationi.

Early life
He was born in Tbilisi, Georgia (then part of Imperial Russia), to Prince George Bagration of Mukhrani (1884–1957) and his wife Helena Sigismundovna, née Nowina Złotnicka. The 1921 Red Army invasion of Georgia forced the family to leave Georgia. Educated in Germany, Prince Irakli then settled in Italy in the 1930s.

Personal life
He married (first) and divorced Maria Belaiev. He married (second) Maria Antonietta née Pasquini dei Conti di Costafiorita (1911-1944) in 1940. Following her death in childbirth in 1944, Irakli, with his infant son Giorgi, moved to Spain, where he naturalized and married (third) Infanta Doña María de las Mercedes Raimunda de Baviera y Borbón (1911–1953), a niece of Alfonso XIII of Spain, in 1946 at the Castle of San Sebastian, Spain. She died in 1953, leaving the daughter Mariam (born 1947) and son Bagrat (1949-2017) behind, and Prince Irakli married (fourth) María del Pilar Pascual y Roig (d. 1994), Marquesa de Carsani, in 1961.

Career
Irakli Bagration-Mukhraneli played a prominent role in Georgian political emigration circles and, as an active royalist, remained in opposition to  Soviet rule in Georgia. He restored the Order of the Eagle of Georgia and the Seamless Tunic of Our Lord Jesus Christ in 1939.
In April 1942 the German diplomat  Friedrich-Werner von der Schulenberg attempted to unite Caucasus émigré leaders from the Northern Caucasus, Azerbaijan, Armenia, and Georgia - including Irakli Bagration - at the "Adlon meeting" in Berlin; however, the émigrés failed to obtain the endorsement of  Alfred Rosenberg's  for recognition of independence in return for collaboration with the Axis powers.
Irakli Bagration sponsored the establishment in the Northern-hemisphere autumn of 1942 of the Germany-based Union of Georgian Traditionalists, which fought to restore Georgia's sovereignty from the USSR and advocated a constitutional monarchy as a form of the government for an independent Georgia. In 1942 Georgian exiles in Rome recognised him as a pretender to the Georgian throne.

Following his father's death in 1957, Prince Irakli succeeded as Head of the Princely House of Mukhrani and declared himself Head of the Royal House of Georgia, assuming the style of "His Royal Highness". He died in Madrid in 1977. His remains lay in the  British Cemetery of Madrid until transferred to the Svetitskhoveli Cathedral in Mtskheta in 1995.

Patronages 
 Member of the Union of the Nobility of Majorca.
 Member of the Majorca Academy for Genealogical Studies.

Honours 
 Founder and Grand Master of the Order of Queen Tamara.
 Founder and Grand Master of the Order of the Eagle of Georgia.
 Grand Provincial of the Order of Queen Ketevan.
 Knight of the Order of St. Andrew the First Called.
 Knight of the Order of Alexander Nevsky.
 Knight of the Order of the White Eagle.
 Knight 1st class of the Order of St. Stanislaus.
 Knight 1st class of the Order of St. Anna. 
 Knight Grand Cross of the Order of St. Sava.
 Knight Grand Cross of the Order of Vasco Núñez de Balboa.
 Knight Grand Cross of the Order of the White Eagle. 
 Knight Grand Cross with Collar of the Order of St. Lazarus of Jerusalem.

Ancestors

References

External links 

 Amadeo-Martín Rey y Cabieses (2005), Wittelsbach Y Borbón: Relaciones Y Enlaces Entre Las Casas Reales De Baviera Y De España. Siglos XIX Al XXI

1909 births
1977 deaths
Irakli Bagration of Mukhrani
Nobility of Georgia (country)
Politicians from Tbilisi
Pretenders to the Georgian throne
Emigrants from the Russian Empire to Spain
Emigrants from the Russian Empire to Italy
Emigrants from the Russian Empire to Germany